Robert W. Derminer (December 12, 1944 – September 18, 1991), known as Rob Tyner, was an American musician best known as lead singer for the Detroit proto-punk band MC5. His adopted surname was in tribute to the jazz pianist McCoy Tyner. It was Tyner who issued the rallying cry of "kick out the jams, motherfuckers" at the MC5's live concerts.  Tyner had originally auditioned as the bass player, but the band felt his talents would be best used as a lead vocalist.

Biography

MC5 
Tyner joined the group that was to become MC5 in 1964.<ref>MC5 – 10 of the best. The Guardian;;. 17 August 2017. Retrieved 5 September 2021.</ref> He auditioned to be bassist but soon became lead vocalist. 

MC5 earned national attention with their first album, Kick Out the Jams, recorded live on October 30 and 31, 1968, at Detroit's Grande Ballroom. Critic Mark Deming writes that Kick out the Jams is:

The album caused some controversy due to Sinclair's inflammatory liner notes and the title track's rallying cry of "Kick out the jams, motherfuckers!" According to Kramer, the band recorded this as "Kick out the jams, brothers and sisters!" for the single released for radio play; Tyner claimed this was done without group consensus. The edited version also appeared in some LP copies, which also withdrew Sinclair's excitable comments. The album was released in January 1969.

He remained with the band until late 1972, when the MC5 split up.

 Other Works 
In 1977, Tyner collaborated with Eddie & the Hot Rods for a 7-inch release coinciding with a promotional UK tour to promote MC5 vinyl reissues. Simultaneously back in the US, Tyner had launched "the New MC5" which later operated as the Rob Tyner Band and laid the foundation for "Rob Tyner & the National Rock Group", a project which was prolific but issued no recordings. In 1985, Tyner donated his talents to a benefit LP for Vietnam Veterans. 

Tyner dipped into the song catalog of the National Rock Group for his Blood Brothers CD (1990) and plans were afoot to play more live shows, (including plans with Blackfoot drummer Jakson Spires) when he died in 1991.

Death
On September 17, 1991, Tyner suffered a heart attack in the seat of his parked car close to his home town of Berkley, Michigan. He was taken to Beaumont Hospital in Royal Oak, where he died, leaving his wife, Becky, and three children.

Discography

MC5
Albums
 Kick Out the Jams (1969)
 Back in the USA (1970)
 High Time (1971)

Robin Tyner & The Hot Rods
 "Till the Night Is Gone (Let's Rock) / Flipside Rock" (1977)

Stev Manteiv
 Ambush (1985)

Solo
 Blood Brothers (1990)

References

Further reading

David Thomas (1999) The (R)Evolution of Rob Tyner. Future/Now Films
John Sinclair (May 1967). Robin Tyner interview for The Warren-Forest Sun''
 

1944 births
1991 deaths
American rock singers
MC5 members
Protopunk musicians
20th-century American singers
Singers from Detroit
People from Berkley, Michigan
20th-century American male singers